Uxin Banner (Mongolian:   Üüsin qosiɣu; Mongolian Cyrillic: Үүшин Хошуу) (or Wushen) is a banner in the southwest of Inner Mongolia, People's Republic of China, bounded to the south by Shaanxi province. It borders the banners of Ejin Horo to the northeast, Hanggin to the north, Otog to the northwest, and Otog Front to the southwest. It is under the administration of Ordos City.

Climate

References

www.xzqh.org 

Banners of Inner Mongolia
Ordos City